Jamal Maarouf (Arabic: جمال معروف) is a Syrian rebel leader who was one of the most powerful rebel leaders in northern Syria during the earlier stages of the Syrian Civil War. He is the military chief of the Syria Revolutionaries Front and leader of the Syrian Martyrs' Brigade, both part of the Free Syrian Army.

Biography
Before the uprising against president Bashar al-Assad, Jamal Maarouf was a construction worker. He was one of the first to take up arms in the Idlib province against the Assad government. Jamal Maarouf created the Syrian Martyrs' Brigade in December 2011 and later the Syria Revolutionaries Front, with funding by Saudi Arabia. The SRF was accused of corruption and of hoarding bread to raise prices in areas under its control, prompting the  al-Nusra Front to attack it. Maarouf then fled to Turkey after his force was defeated by the al-Nusra Front in late 2014.

References

1975 births
Living people
Members of the Free Syrian Army
Place of birth missing (living people)